The Ocean Drilling Program (ODP) was a multinational effort to explore and study the composition and structure of the Earth's oceanic basins, running from 1985 to 2004. ODP was the successor to the Deep Sea Drilling Project initiated in 1968 by the United States. ODP was an international effort with contributions of Australia, Germany, France, Japan, the United Kingdom and the ESF Consortium for Ocean Drilling (ECOD) including 12 further countries. The program used the drillship JOIDES Resolution on 110 expeditions (legs) to collect about 2,000 deep sea cores from major geological features located in the ocean basins of the world. Drilling discoveries led to further questions and hypotheses, as well as to new disciplines in earth sciences such as the field of paleoceanography. 

In 2004 ODP transformed into the Integrated Ocean Drilling Program (IODP).

See also

References

External links
 
 ODP Legacy Website
 ODP publications

Marine geology
Projects established in 1985